The terms Russians of the Caucasus; Caucasus Russians; Caucasian Russians; or Krasnodar Russians all refer to ethnic Russians living in the Caucasus.  These terms are specific to a community of Russians because the North Caucasus is part of the Russian Federation, and Russians here are not outside of Russia, but they are in a part of Russia where as a whole Russians are an ethnic minority.  The regions of Krasnodar Krai; Stavropol Krai; Astrakhan Oblast; and Rostov Oblast are not considered ethnic territories unlike most other Caucasian republics because they have a Russian majority, and they are part of Russia.

History of Russians in the Caucasus

There was always a small Russian community in the north of the Caucasus, whose boundary is generally accepted as the Volga river.  This is due to its location near Rostov, a prominent Russian city in medieval times, and today an important city.  The existence of a large and notable Russian community is generally thought to have come about during the Russian conquest of the Caucasus.  The vast expanses of the north with no dominant native ethnic group with today a Russian majority were probably inhabited by Tatars, who in fact still form the majority in parts of the northern Caucasus.

Russian people by location
Peoples of the Caucasus